Patricia Lamond Lawman AM (born 29 March 1932), professionally known as Toni Lamond, is an Australian vaudevillian, cabaret performer, singer, actress, dancer, and comedian. She has had a successful career spanning some 80 years, both locally and internationally, including in the United Kingdom and United States

She was given the nickname of "Lolly-Legs Lamond" by actor Noel Ferrier, after being voted as having the second-best pair of legs in television while appearing on TV show In Melbourne Tonight.

Lamond started her career as a variety entertainer at only ten and was the first woman in the world to host a midday show. The second was her younger half-sister Helen Reddy.

She appeared in the series Number 96 as Karen Winters in a controversial "Black Mass" storyline

Alongside contemporaries Jill Perryman and Nancye Hayes, she has been called one of the three grand dames of Australian musical theatre, and in her prime a talent that could rival Doris Day

Biography

Early life

Lamond was born in Sydney, Australia in 1932, as Patricia Lamond Lawman. She learned to tap dance at 8 and began her professional career at the age of 10 when she sang on the radio while touring with her vaudevillian parents in variety shows, which included her actress mother Stella Lamond and father Joe Lawman.

Theatre and variety

Her first stage performances were at the Tivoli Theatre in Sydney. Her first performances as a leading lady were with English comedian Tommy Trinder in The Tommy Trinder Show in 1952.

She has starred in Australian productions of Oliver!, Annie Get Your Gun, The Pajama Game, and Gypsy: A Musical Fable.

Screen

Lamond was a regular in a number of 1970s television shows, such as Number 96 and Graham Kennedy's In Melbourne Tonight.  She later compèred her own IMT, becoming the first woman in the world to compère a variety television show.

In 1986, she appeared on the US television fiction crime series Murder, She Wrote starring Angela Lansbury in the episode "Murder in the Electric Cathedral". She also appeared in films including telemovies and features such as the 2007 Razzle Dazzle: A Journey Into Dance.

International career, recordings and stage

Lamond travelled to the United Kingdom, where in a similar vein to entertainer Lorrae Desmond, she appeared in the British night club and cabaret, circuit and on BBC-TV and BBC Radio. She also recorded two singles for record label; Philips in London.

In the mid-1970s, Lamond moved to Los Angeles, where she appeared in musicals and television shows. She debuted on the New York stage with a production Cabaret at the age of 67. On her return to Australia in the mid-1990s, she performed in shows including 42nd Street, The Pirates of Penzance, and My Fair Lady.

In April–May 2008, she appeared in an autobiographical one-woman show, Times of My Life (co-written with her son Tony Sheldon), at the Seymour Centre in Sydney.

Publications

Lamond has written several autobiographical books, including First Half (1990), Along the Way (2002), and Still a Gypsy (2007). The first book went to the top of the bestseller list in eight days.

In July 2010, Lamond was a headline act in the inaugural Melbourne Cabaret Festival.

Notable work

She joined the Tasmanian Symphony Orchestra with Trisha Crowe, Michael Falzon, Amanda Harrison, Lucy Maunder, Andy Conaghan, and others to record I Dreamed A Dream: The Hit Songs of Broadway for ABC Classics, released on 21 June 2013. Lamond sang "Send in the Clowns" from Stephen Sondheim's A Little Night Music.

Stage (selection)
Sources: Austage, IBDB

Filmography 

FILM

TELEVISION

Awards and honours

Actors Equity president Simon Burke says: "Toni is a truly legendary Australian performer whose phenomenal career has spanned vaudeville, musical theatre, television, and cabaret. She is also a wonderful human being who has given back to her community, to her colleagues, and to her industry in every way she can."

Personal life and family

Lamond has a significant pedigree within the Australian performing arts. She is the daughter of Stella Lamond (Homicide and Bellbird) and Joe Lawman, both vaudeville entertainers. Her parents divorced when she was seven and Stella remarried Max Reddy (Homicide). She is a half-sister to the late singer Helen Reddy, whom she raised as a surrogate mother while their parents were performing.
She married Frank Sheldon in 1954, but in 1966 shortly after a separation, he killed himself. An addiction to prescription drugs followed, and she was a patient at Chelmsford Private Hospital, where she underwent deep sleep therapy. She overcame and publicly discussed the issue in an episode of The Mike Walsh Show, becoming one of the first Australian media personalities to do so.

Her son is actor and writer Tony Sheldon.

References

External links
 

1932 births
Living people
Australian stage actresses
Australian television actresses
Australian women singers
Helpmann Award winners
Members of the Order of Australia
Recipients of the Centenary Medal
Singers from Sydney